Otakon Vegas was a three-day anime convention held during January at the Planet Hollywood Resort and Casino in Las Vegas, Nevada. The convention was organized by Otakorp, the group behind Otakon.

Programming
The convention typically offered an artist alley, concerts, dealer's room, masquerade, and panels. One of the new programming experiments at Otakon Vegas demonstrated Sumo wrestling.

History
Otakorp announced in early 2013 a new convention would be held at the Planet Hollywood Resort and Casino in Las Vegas, Nevada where they hope to create a smaller convention and test new ideas. Otakon has had issues where new test content has been too successful such as the 2012 Maid Cafe. Representatives from Las Vegas first approached Otakorp about moving Otakon from Baltimore to Las Vegas. Expansion to Vegas was also chosen due to Otakon reaching capacity in Baltimore, along with Vegas being accessible with affordable transportation and several hotel/food options. January dates were chosen for the reason attendees should be less busy. Concerns were raised about the location due to the existence of two conventions in the Las Vegas area.

The convention's first year in 2014 featured more than 70 hours of programming. JAM Project appeared at 2015's opening ceremony while on the ANISONG World Tour Lantis Festival in Las Vegas. Otakon Vegas went on hiatus after 2018's event.

Event history

See also
Otakon

References

External links
Otakon Vegas website

Inactive anime conventions
Recurring events established in 2014
2014 establishments in Nevada
Annual events in Nevada
Festivals in Nevada
Culture of the Las Vegas Valley
Las Vegas Valley conventions and trade shows
Conventions in Nevada